ACM Transactions on Information Systems (ACM TOIS) is a quarterly peer-reviewed scientific journal covering research on computer systems and their underlying technology. It was established in 1983 and is published by the Association for Computing Machinery.  The editor-in-chief is Maarten de Rijke (University of Amsterdam). The editor-in-chief is Min Zhang (Tsinghua University).

The journal is abstracted and indexed in the Science Citation Index Expanded and Current Contents/Engineering, Computing & Technology. According to the Journal Citation Reports, the journal has a 2020 impact factor of 4.797.

References

External links 
 

Computer science journals
Information systems journals
Publications established in 1983
Information Systems
Quarterly journals
English-language journals